Anita Best C.M. is a teacher, broadcaster, and well-known singer from the Atlantic province of Newfoundland and Labrador, Canada.

With Genevieve Lehr, Best collected the songs for Come and I Will Sing You: A Newfoundland Songbook, spending years travelling around the province collecting songs from anyone who cared to sing.

In 2015 the Newfoundland and Labrador Folk Arts Society awarded her their Lifetime Achievement Award.

Best was appointed a Member of the Order of Canada in 2011.  The citation read, in part, "As a singer, storyteller and archivist, she has been active in collecting and performing the songs and tales of her ancestors, ensuring this priceless cultural legacy is not lost to future generations."

Discography
Albums
 Some Songs (with Sandy Morris)
 Crosshanded
 The Color of Amber (with Pamela Morgan)
 Amber Christmas (with Pamela Morgan and others)
 Lately Come Over - Bristol's Hope
 Eleven Eleven

Contributing artist
 All The Best
 Another Time
 Rock Within The Sea
 Mujeres en la Musica (Spanish Release)
 Celtic Spirits II (German Release)
 Celtic Feelings (French Release)
 ''The Rough Guide to the Music of Canada (2005, World Music Network)

References

 Information from Amber Music

Members of the Order of Canada
Year of birth missing (living people)
Living people
People from Placentia, Newfoundland and Labrador
Canadian folk musicians
Canadian music historians
Musicians from Newfoundland and Labrador